The Hart Building is a historic commercial building located at 26-30 West 3rd Street at the corner of Court Street in Williamsport, Pennsylvania. Exterior decorative elements include pressed brickwork, terra cotta, carved stone, wood window sash and frame, and pressed metal cornice and window trim. It was designed by noted Williamsport architect Amos S. Wagner.

The building was added to the National Register of Historic Places in 1984.

See also

National Register of Historic Places listings in Lycoming County, Pennsylvania

References

External links

Buildings and structures in Williamsport, Pennsylvania
Commercial buildings on the National Register of Historic Places in Pennsylvania
Commercial buildings completed in 1895
National Register of Historic Places in Lycoming County, Pennsylvania